Icupima laevipennis is a species of beetle in the family Cerambycidae. It was described by Charles Joseph Gahan in 1892. It is known from Ecuador and Panama.

References

Hemilophini
Beetles described in 1892